The 2022 Alaska Senate elections took place on November 8, 2022, with the primary elections being held on August 16, 2022. State senators serve four-year terms in the Alaska Senate, with half of the seats normally up for election every two years. However, because most districts were greatly changed in redistricting, elections were held for 19 of the 20 seats. The only exception is District T, represented by Democrat Donny Olson, which was mostly unchanged in redistricting and thus did not have an election. Some senators were elected to serve four-year terms, while others would serve shortened two-year terms.

Following the previous election in 2020, Republicans had control of the Alaska Senate with 13 seats to Democrats' 7 seats. One Democrat caucused with the Republicans, giving them a governing majority of 14 seats.

Background
In 2020, Alaskan voters approved Ballot Measure 2, an initiative to implement a nonpartisan blanket top-four primary with a single, open primary where candidates from all parties are listed on the ballot and the top four vote getters advance to the general election. The general election is then resolved using instant-runoff voting, where voters rank the candidates and the candidates receiving the lowest votes are eliminated one by one until one candidate has a majority. The first elections using the new system was the 2022 election cycle. As of the close of candidate filing, none of the elections for the Alaska Senate had more than four candidates.

Predictions

Overview

Primary elections 

Two Republicans and one Democrat withdrew before the general election.

General election

Summary of results 


Retiring incumbents
E District: Lora Reinbold (R)
F District: Josh Revak (R) (ran for U.S. House)
H District: Natasha von Imhof (R)
J District: Tom Begich (D)

Detailed results
Source for primary results
Source for general election results

District A

District B

District C

District D 

{| class="wikitable sortable" style="text-align:right"
|+ colspan=6 | General election
|-
! colspan=2 rowspan=2 | Party
! rowspan=2 | Candidate
! colspan=3 | First Choice
! colspan=3 | Round 1
! colspan=3 | Round 2
|-
! Votes
! %
! Transfer
! Votes
! %
! Transfer
! Votes
! %
|-
! style="background-color:" |
| style="text-align:left" | Republican
| style="text-align:left" scope="row" | 
| 6,950
| 45.8
| +122
| 7,072
| 46.6
| +532
| 7,604
| 53.6
|-
! style="background-color:" |
| style="text-align:left" | Republican
| style="text-align:left" scope="row" | 
| 6,311
| 41.6
| +20
| 6,331
| 41.7
| +263
| 6,594
| 46.4
|-
! style="background-color:" |
| style="text-align:left" | Independent
| style="text-align:left" scope="row" | 
| 1,768
| 11.7
| +19
| 1,787
| 11.8
| -1,787
| colspan="2"  style="background:lightgrey; text-align:center;"| Eliminated
|-
! style="background-color:" |
| style="text-align:left" colspan=2 | Write-in
| 140
| 0.9
| -140
| colspan="5"  style="background:lightgrey; text-align:center;"| Eliminated
|- class="sortbottom" style="background-color:#F6F6F6"
! colspan=3 scope="row" style="text-align:right;" | Total votes
! colspan=3 |15,169
! colspan=3 | 15,190
! colspan=3 |14,198
|- class="sortbottom"
|- class="sortbottom" style="background-color:#F6F6F6"
! colspan=6 scope="row" style="text-align:right;" | Blank or inactive ballots
! colspan=2 | 1,046
| +992
! colspan=2 | 2,038
|- class="sortbottom" style="background:#f6f6f6;"
! style="background-color:" |
| style="text-align:left" colspan=10 | Republican hold

District E 

{| class="wikitable sortable" style="text-align:right"
|+ colspan=6 | General election 
|-
! colspan=2 rowspan=2 | Party
! rowspan=2 | Candidate
! colspan=3 | First Choice
! colspan=3 | Round 1
! colspan=3 | Round 2
|-
! Votes
! %
! Transfer
! Votes
! %
! Transfer
! Votes
! %
|-
! style="background-color:" |
| style="text-align:left" | Republican
| style="text-align:left" scope="row" | 
| 5,611 
| 33.6
| +41
| 5,652
| 33.8
| +2,229
| 7,881
| 57.0
|-
! style="background-color:" |
| style="text-align:left" | Republican
| style="text-align:left" scope="row" |  (incumbent)
| 5,521
| 33.1
| +11
| 5,532
| 33.1
| +417
| 5,949
| 43.0
|-
! style="background-color:" |
| style="text-align:left" | Democratic
| style="text-align:left" scope="row" | 
| 5,490
| 32.9
| +28
| 5,518
| 33.0
| -5,518
| colspan=2  align=center|Eliminated
|-
! style="background-color:" |
| style="text-align:left" colspan=2 | Write-in
| 58
| 0.4
| -58
| colspan="5"  style="background:lightgrey; text-align:center;"| Eliminated
|- class="sortbottom" style="background-color:#F6F6F6"
! colspan=3 scope="row" style="text-align:right;" | Total votes
! colspan=3 |16,680
! colspan=3 | 16,702
! colspan=3 |13,830
|- class="sortbottom"
|- class="sortbottom" style="background-color:#F6F6F6"
! colspan=6 scope="row" style="text-align:right;" | Blank or inactive ballots
! colspan=2 | 735
| +2,872
! colspan=2 | 3,607
|- class="sortbottom" style="background:#f6f6f6;"
! style="background-color:" |
| style="text-align:left" colspan=10 | Republican hold

District F

District G

District H

District I

District J 

Democrat Drew Cason withdrew prior to the general election.

District K

District L 

Republicans Joe Wright and Clayton Trotter withdrew prior to the general election.

District M

District N 

{| class="wikitable sortable" style="text-align:right"
|+ colspan=6 | General election
|-
! colspan=2 rowspan=2 | Party
! rowspan=2 | Candidate
! colspan=3 | First Choice
! colspan=3 | Round 1
! colspan=3 | Round 2
|-
! Votes
! %
! Transfer
! Votes
! %
! Transfer
! Votes
! %
|-
! style="background-color:" |
| style="text-align:left" | Republican
| style="text-align:left" scope="row" |  (incumbent)
| 5,133
| 44.5
| +37
| 5,170
| 44.8
| +954
| 6,124
| 58.7
|-
! style="background-color:" |
| style="text-align:left" | Republican
| style="text-align:left" scope="row" | 
| 3,347
| 29.0
| +38
| 3,385
| 29.4
| +926
| 4,311
| 41.3
|-
! style="background-color:" |
| style="text-align:left" | Republican
| style="text-align:left" scope="row" | 
| 2,923
| 25.3
| +54
| 2,977
| 25.8
| -2,977
| colspan=3  align=center|Eliminated
|-
! style="background-color:" |
| style="text-align:left" colspan=2 | Write-in
| 141
| 1.2
| -141
| colspan=5  align=center|Eliminated
|- class="sortbottom" style="background-color:#F6F6F6"
! colspan=3 scope="row" style="text-align:right;" | Total votes
! colspan=3 |11,544
! colspan=3 | 11,532
! colspan=3 |10,435
|- class="sortbottom"
|- class="sortbottom" style="background-color:#F6F6F6"
! colspan=6 scope="row" style="text-align:right;" | Blank or inactive ballots
! colspan=2 | 2,244
| +1,097
! colspan=2 | 3,341
|- class="sortbottom" style="background:#f6f6f6;"
! style="background-color:" |
| style="text-align:left" colspan=10 | Republican hold

District O

District P

District Q

District R

District S

Aftermath
Negotiations for a governing coalition in the state senate occurred after ranked-choice votes in the state were tabulated. The bipartisan coalition was announced two days later on November 25, with eight Republicans and nine Democrats leading the new Senate majority. They stated that their top priorities would be energy costs, education, and the economy. Incoming Senate President Gary Stevens also remarked that the bipartisan coalition was necessary to pass responsible budgets and respond to calls for "more moderation" by the electorate.

See also 
2022 United States Senate election in Alaska
2022 United States House of Representatives elections in Alaska
2022 United States gubernatorial elections
2022 United States state legislative elections
2022 Alaska House of Representatives election
2022 Alaska elections

Notes

References

External links

senate
2020
Alaska Senate